Euceratomycetaceae is a family of fungi in the order Laboulbeniales. These fungi, found mostly in temperate zones, tend to be parasitic or epibiotic on insect exoskeletons.

References

Laboulbeniales
Ascomycota families